Andrew Fogarty (13 April 1879 – 24 April 1953) was an Irish politician. A farmer, he was first elected to Dáil Éireann as a Fianna Fáil Teachta Dála (TD) for the Tipperary constituency at the June 1927 general election. He was re-elected at each subsequent general election until he lost his seat at the 1948 general election. He was elected to Seanad Éireann in 1948 by the Labour Panel. He did not contest the 1951 Seanad election.

References

1879 births
1953 deaths
Fianna Fáil TDs
Members of the 5th Dáil
Members of the 6th Dáil
Members of the 7th Dáil
Members of the 8th Dáil
Members of the 9th Dáil
Members of the 10th Dáil
Members of the 11th Dáil
Members of the 12th Dáil
Members of the 6th Seanad
Politicians from County Tipperary
Irish farmers
Fianna Fáil senators